The 2009–10 season is Levski Sofia's 88th season in the First League. This article shows player statistics and all matches (official and friendly) that the club has played during the 2009–10 season.

First-team squad

Current squad
As of 4 July 2009 (according to latest announcements)

Transfers

Summer transfers

In:

Out:

Winter transfers

In:

Out:

Competitions

Supercup

A Group

Table

Results summary

Results by round

Fixtures and results

Bulgarian Cup

Second round

Levski advanced to Third round.

Third round

Europe

UEFA Champions League

Second qualifying round

Levski advanced to the Third Qualifying round.

Third qualifying round

Levski advanced to the playoff round.

Play-off round

UEFA Europa League
Group stage

Final standings

References

External links
 Levski Sofia official website
 2009–10 Levski Sofia season

PFC Levski Sofia seasons
Levski Sofia